is a Japanese football player. She played for Japan national team.

Club career
Minamiyama was born in Ichikawa on October 16, 1985. In 2003, she joined Nippon TV Beleza from youth team and played until 2010. In 2011, she moved to INAC Kobe Leonessa. She left the club end of 2016 season. In June 2017, she joined Korean WK League club Hwacheon KSPO. In 2019, she returned Japan and joined Orca Kamogawa FC.

National team career
On May 8, 2010, Minamiyama debuted for Japan national team against Mexico. She played 4 games and scored 2 goals for Japan in 2010.

National team statistics

References

External links
INAC Kobe

1985 births
Living people
Japan Women's College of Physical Education alumni
Association football people from Chiba Prefecture
Japanese women's footballers
Japan women's international footballers
Nadeshiko League players
Nippon TV Tokyo Verdy Beleza players
INAC Kobe Leonessa players
Orca Kamogawa FC players
Women's association football midfielders